Wolmarans is a surname from the Alsace-Lorraine region in France. The surname is mostly found in South Africa and was brought there by Joseph Wolmarans (Sources quote Wolmerans). Joseph Wolmarans arrived in Cape Town circa 1746 as a soldier for the Dutch East India Company. Later he held a wine and brandy license in Rondebosch, Cape Town, South Africa. 

People with that name include:
 Senator Andries D W Wolmarans (1857 - 1928). He was a Senator in the Union of South Africa as well as Secretary of State for the Zuid-Afrikaanse Republiek. In the latter capacity, he traveled with a South African delegation to among others, America, Russia, Germany, the Netherlands, Belgium and Switzerland. He was a close advisor to President Paul Kruger in the later stages of the Second South African war.
 Hendrik Petrus Wolmarans (1912 - 1982), South African Land Surveyor.
 Fritz Wolmarans (born 1986), South African tennis player
 Maria Magdalene "Ria" Wolmarans (died 1996), South African murder victim of Mariëtte Bosch
 Mariëtte Wolmarans (born Mariëtte Bosch, 19502001), South African murderer
 Nick Wolmarans (191694), South African boxer
 Willie Wolmarans (active 199293), South African Army officer

See also 
 Wolmaransstad, a town in North West Province, South Africa founded by Jacobus M. A. Wolmarans
 Wolmaransstad Commando, a former light infantry regiment of the South African Army based in Wolmaransstad
 

 Germanic-language surnames
 Afrikaans-language surnames